Waitaki District is a territorial authority district that is located in the Canterbury and Otago regions of the South Island of New Zealand. It straddles the traditional border between the two regions, the Waitaki River, and its seat is Oamaru.

History
Waitaki District is made up of the former Waitaki County, Waihemo County and Oamaru Borough, which were amalgamated in 1989. It is governed by the Waitaki District Council.

Name
During the colonial period, the area was also known as Molesworth. However, the Maori name Waitaki eventually prevailed.

Geography
It is the only district in the South Island that lies in two regions.

A major reason for this split was the governance of the Waitaki River which forms a political boundary between Canterbury and Otago.  With major hydro schemes on this river it was decided to place the entire catchment in one administrative region, thus forming the split.  Some people who fall into the Canterbury Region of Waitaki District still regard themselves as part of Otago, and attempts have been made in the past to change the boundary.  The district, which is agricultural by nature, comprises the wide alluvial fan of the river, and runs inland along the banks of the river, forming a roughly triangular region.

Urban areas and settlements
Oamaru, the district seat, is the only town in the Waitaki district with a population over 1,000. It is home to  people, % of the district's population.

Other settlements and localities in the district include:

Ahuriri Ward:

 Aviemore
 Benmore
 Black Point
 Bortons
 Clearburn
 Danseys Pass
 Duntroon
 Earthquakes
 Kokoamo
 Kurow
 Ohau
 Lake Waitaki
 Lindis Pass
 Livingstone
 Maerewhenua
 Omarama
 Otekaieke
 Otematata
 Otiake
 Pukeraro
 Strachans
 Waikaura
 Wharekuri

Waihemo Ward:

 Billys Flat
 Dunback
 Flag Swamp
 Glenpark
 Goodwood
 Green Valley
 Hampden
 Hillgrove
 Inch Valley
 Kaika
 Katiki
 Macraes
 Makareao
 Meadowbank
 Moeraki
 Moonlight Flat
 Morrisons
 Nenthorn
 Palmerston
 Pleasant Valley
 Shag Point
 Shag Valley
 Stoneburn
 Trotters Gorge
 Waianakarua
 Waihemo
 Wairunga
 Waynes
 Puketapu

Corriedale Ward:

 Airedale
 All Day Bay
 Awamoko
 Cormacks
 Corriedale
 Elderslie
 Enfield
 Five Forks
 Fuchsia Creek
 Georgetown
 Herbert
 Hilderthorpe
 Incholme
 Island Cliff
 Island Stream
 Kakanui
 Kauru Hill
 Kia Ora
 Kuriheka
 Maheno
 Maraeweka
 Marakerake
 Maruakoa
 Ngapara
 Otepopo
 Papakaio
 Peebles
 Pukeuri
 Queens Flat
 Reidston
 Richmond
 Rosebery
 Tapui
 Taranui
 Teschemakers
 Tokarahi
 Totara
 Waimotu
 Waitaki Bridge
 Whitecraig
 Whitstone
 Windsor Park
 Windsor

Oamaru Ward:
 Ardgowan
 Oamaru
 Weston

Demographics

Waitaki District had a population of 22,308 at the 2018 New Zealand census, an increase of 1,479 people (7.1%) since the 2013 census, and an increase of 2,085 people (10.3%) since the 2006 census. There were 9,171 households. There were 10,974 males and 11,331 females, giving a sex ratio of 0.97 males per female. The median age was 45.6 years (compared with 37.4 years nationally), with 4,071 people (18.2%) aged under 15 years, 3,348 (15.0%) aged 15 to 29, 9,819 (44.0%) aged 30 to 64, and 5,070 (22.7%) aged 65 or older.

Ethnicities were 88.0% European/Pākehā, 8.2% Māori, 3.8% Pacific peoples, 5.3% Asian, and 1.9% other ethnicities. People may identify with more than one ethnicity.

The percentage of people born overseas was 15.4, compared with 27.1% nationally.

Although some people objected to giving their religion, 47.9% had no religion, 41.5% were Christian, 0.6% were Hindu, 0.3% were Muslim, 0.5% were Buddhist and 1.8% had other religions.

Of those at least 15 years old, 2,331 (12.8%) people had a bachelor or higher degree, and 4,719 (25.9%) people had no formal qualifications. The median income was $27,700, compared with $31,800 nationally. 2,019 people (11.1%) earned over $70,000 compared to 17.2% nationally. The employment status of those at least 15 was that 8,529 (46.8%) people were employed full-time, 2,826 (15.5%) were part-time, and 441 (2.4%) were unemployed.

Economy
A relatively sparsely settled area, the District has a large number of farms. However, in recent times (late 2000s), numerous proposals for new farming operations have locals fearing that the agriculture will be transformed from often family-held farms to large agribusiness operations causing local ecological damage and siphoning off capital overseas.

References

External links

Waitaki District Council
Information about Waitaki District
Waitaki Development Board